Maksim Romanovich Tarasov (born 22 May 2001) is a Russian football player. He plays for FC Avangard Kursk.

Club career
He made his debut in the Russian Football National League for FC Avangard Kursk on 9 March 2020 in a game against FC Torpedo Moscow. He substituted Denis Sinyayev in the 54th minute.

References

External links
 Profile by Russian Football National League
 
 

2001 births
Living people
Russian footballers
Association football midfielders
FC Avangard Kursk players
Russian First League players